A coal drop is an elevated railway track designed to allow material to fall freely between the rails onto the ground beneath. It is used to rapidly unload hoppers containing coal and other bulk cargo. It is also referred to, in North East England, as a staith.

References 

Railway freight terminals